Oslo Pretenders Sportsklubb (Oslo Pretenders) has been the leading baseball team in Norway since 1991, winning 21 National Championships (NM) and 18 League Titles (NBL). The team has also participated in the European Cup every year between 2001-2010.

The club has in recent years expanded with a basketball team and a disc golf team.

References

External links
Official website
By-laws of the Oslo Pretenders Baseball Club (.doc, in Norwegian)
Oslo Pretenders Sportsklubb on Facebook
Oslo Pretenders Baseball on Facebook
Oslo Pretenders Basketball on Facebook
Oslo Pretenders Disc Golf on Facebook

Baseball teams in Europe
Sports teams in Norway